Théonoé  is an opera by the French composer Joseph François Salomon, first performed at the Académie Royale de Musique (the Paris Opera) on 3 December 1715. It takes the form of a tragédie en musique in a prologue and five acts. The libretto is by Simon-Joseph Pellegrin, using the pseudonym "La Roque".

Sources
 Libretto at "Livrets baroques"
 Félix Clément and Pierre Larousse Dictionnaire des Opéras, Paris, 1881, page 659.

French-language operas
Tragédies en musique
Operas by Joseph François Salomon
Operas
1715 operas